The Singapore Grip is an ITV six-part television drama series. It is an adaptation of Booker Prize winner J.G. Farrell's 1978 novel The Singapore Grip. The story tells of a love affair taking place around the time of the Japanese invasion of Singapore. It stars Luke Treadaway, David Morrissey and Elizabeth Tan.

The series debut was on BBC First in Australia on 26 July 2020, followed by 13 September on UK's ITV.

Synopsis
The story focuses on a British family, the Blacketts, who control one of the leading trading companies in colonial-era Singapore, and the son of his business partner, Matthew Webb. Walter Blackett is keen that Matthew Webb should marry his daughter Joan, but Matthew is interested instead in a mysterious Chinese woman, Vera Chiang. When the Japanese invade and occupy Singapore, the couple is forced apart. A running joke in the story is Matthew trying to find out what "the Singapore Grip" means, and getting different answers from different people he talks to.

Cast
 Charles Dance as Mr. Webb
 Luke Treadaway as Matthew Webb
 David Morrissey as  Walter Blackett
 Georgia Blizzard as Joan Blackett
 Jane Horrocks as Sylvia Blackett
 Lilo Baier as Kate Blackett
 Luke Newberry as  Monty Blackett
 Colm Meaney as Major Brendan Archer
 Elizabeth Tan as Vera Chiang
 Bart Edwards as Ehrendorf
 Christophe Guybet as Dupigny

Production

ITV commissioned the production of an adaptation of the J. G. Farrell book, The Singapore Grip, in February 2018. The production company Mammoth Screen approached Christopher Hampton to write the screenplay. Hampton, who knew Farrell very well before he died in 1979, readily agreed. The series was  executive produced by Damien Timmer, and filming began in early 2019.

The series was filmed in various locations in and around Kuala Lumpur and Penang in Malaysia rather than in Singapore which has become too well-developed to reflect the look and feel of the colonial era. The mansions of Carcosa Seri Negara in Perdana Botanical Gardens in Kuala Lumpur served as the residences of the Blacketts and Mr Webb. A vintage plane from a museum in a military airbase was used for the arrival of Matthew Webb, and an abandoned town near Kuala Lumpur airport was used for the firefighting scene. The Battle of Slim River was also filmed near Kuala Lumpur, as was the plantation scene filmed at Broga Plantation. Other locations that doubled for old Singapore included the Royal Selangor Club and Wisma Ekran (Anglo-Oriental Building) in Kuala Lumpur, Church of Our Lady of Lourdes in Klang, as well as Georgetown's Chinatown, City Hall, cricket ground and Esplanade, Swettenham Pier, the Lebuh Aceh Mosque Compound, the Thai Pak Koong Temple, and Balik Pulau Rice Field in Penang.

Episodes
STV Player uploaded all six episodes at once as a boxset on 13 September 2020, whereas the ITV Hub uploaded each episode individually after broadcast every Sunday, from 13 September-18 October 2020.

Critical reception 
The Guardian gave it two stars, and called the satire "bite-free", saying the humour was "oddly pitched" and "cast between two poles, neither vicious nor silly enough to make sense of telling yet another colonial story from an almost entirely white perspective". The Independent also gave the series two stars, criticizing the tone and stating, "It can't decide how sharp to be, veering between a Catch-22-style black comedy about the horrors of war and a jolly-old-marriage farce, complete with a relentless big band soundtrack." Anita Singh of The Daily Telegraph rated it better at three stars, but still considered it lacking the bite of the book. She thought the drama appeared rather "more akin to a cosy Jeeves and Wooster-style comedy"; the "cosiness is deliberate – the invasion will come as a rude awakening – but what worked on the page does not transfer easily to the screen. It ends up looking like any other jolly ITV drama."

James Delingpole of The Spectator was more positive, describing the cast as "splendid, the colonial setting lavishly realised... This is the Sunday night TV many of us feared they'd never dare make any more."

Controversy
The advocacy group British East and South East Asians working in the Theatre and Screen industries criticised the series as "colonial history told through a white gaze", whose "Asian characters are merely heavily accented ciphers, silent chauffeurs, exotic dancers, giggly prostitutes, monosyllabic grunts and half-naked Yogis". Screenwriter Christopher Hampton defended the books on which the series is based as "perhaps the most celebrated attack on colonialism by a British novelist in the 20th century".

References

External links
 

2020 British television series debuts
2020 British television series endings
2020s British drama television series
2020s British television miniseries
Costume drama television series
English-language television shows
ITV television dramas
Television series by ITV Studios
Television series by Mammoth Screen
Television shows set in Singapore